Veneranda Nzambazamariya (died 30 January 2000) was a women's leader in Rwanda. She was posthumously awarded the Millennium Peace Prize for Women.

Quotes

References

2000 deaths
Anti-war activists
Rwandan feminists
Rwandan women
Date of birth missing